"Embryo" (Stylized "embryo") is the 12th single by Japanese heavy metal band Dir En Grey, released on December 19, 2001.

The first B-side, "Zomboid Reishiki Mix", is a remixed recording by Shinya and Toshiya of another track off the band's same album, Kisō. The second B-side is "Embryo Uteute Boogie-Woogie Elegy Mix" a remix of the title track done by Die.

Track listing
All lyrics are written by Kyo; Music composed by Dir En Grey.

Chart position

Personnel 
 Dir En Grey
 Kyo – vocals, lyricist
 Kaoru – guitar
 Die – guitar
 Toshiya – bass guitar
 Shinya – drums
 Hiroshi Tomioka - Executive producer

References 

2001 singles
2002 singles
Dir En Grey songs
Songs written by Kyo (musician)
2001 songs